Prince Udaya Priyantha (13 June 1970 – 8 June 2017) was a Sri Lankan singer, composer and songwriter.

Personal life
Born in the rural village of Siripura, Nawadagala in Galle, Prince started his music career as a keyboard player in the early 1990s, with his inborn abilities. His father Eaton Fernando, was a former violinist in Sri Lanka Broadcasting Corporation, and also a former principal and a music teacher. His mother Rosalyn Palliyaguruge was also principal, who died in 2014 in a Dubai Hospital. Prince has one sister, Shiromi Priyangika, who cared for Prince until his death.

He stated that, though he has not married, he had a relationship with fellow female singer Nirosha Virajini, which did not extend up to the marriage, however.

Singing career
Prince completed his education from Elpitiya Ananda Maha Vidyalaya and showcased his musical abilities at the time of school. His first music teacher was Nihal Gamhewa, but the classes were interrupted due to 1987–89 JVP insurrections. In 1990, Prince attended the Belwood Music Academy of National Youth Services Council and worked as a violinist, under Gamhewa. He completed Bellwood Diploma after three years along with fellow musicians such as Chandana Liyanaarachchi, and Jayasiri Amarasekara. With the completion, he asked his music teacher to write some songs for him. With that, Gamhewa wrote four songs for him, which included Pemwathun Sinase, Werala Konaka Hida, Adare Nam Ai, Sanda Kumariyak. These four songs were highlighted due to the usage of musical instrument Octapad for the first time in Sri Lankan music industry.

He popularized as a singer in 1992 with the song Sanda Kumariyak Digeka Yanawa and made his mark in open stages and television music industry. Some of his most popular songs include Sigiriye Kurutu Geetha, Oba Hamuwu Dine, Sudu Mal Pokurak, Sadarenu Wahena and Samudenna Samuganna Nam.

Illness and death
In 2014, after his mother's death, Prince was hospitalized in Dubai due to trauma. On 17 December 2015, Prince was first admitted to Karapitiya Teaching Hospital due to intense fever and his brain was infected with germs. With his critical condition, many welfare organizations and fellow artists started to collect funds to cure him. After some treatments, Prince was released from the hospital but had to take medicines continuously. When he was at home, many rumors indicated that he was healthier, but his sister denied all those and informed that Prince was not well and he has treatments for diabetes and malfunctioning left leg.

However, in March 2017, Prince was hospitalized again to Nawaloka Hospital due to germ infection to his brain. He has to be treated with injection course each for five consecutive days. Many rumors around the internet informed that he was dead, but were refused by his sister many times. Due to these rumours, the funds for his treatments also reduced and this induced his family to sell their land properties and vehicles as well. Meanwhile, Minister of Parliament Reforms and Mass Media Gayantha Karunathilaka presented a cheque amounting to Rs. 100,000 for his medical treatments as well.

On 8 June 2017, Prince died at the hospital at the age of 47. His body was kept for 4 days at his residence and buried on 11 June 2017. However, the hospital bill was not finalized prior to his death. The total of more than 25 lakhs was finalized after a donation from a musical show organized by the Sri Lanka Singer Association.

Track listing

References 

1970 births
2017 deaths
People from Galle
20th-century Sri Lankan male singers
Sinhalese singers
21st-century Sri Lankan male singers